In automotive design, dual-motor, four-wheel-drive layout is mainly used by battery electric vehicles by placing electric motors on both front and rear axles and drives all four roadwheels, creating a four-wheel drive layout. This layout is made possible by the small size of electric motors compared to internal combustion engines, allowing it to be placed in multiple locations. It also eliminates the need of a drive shaft that are commonly used by conventional four-wheel drive vehicles to create space for batteries that are commonly mounted on the floor of electric vehicles.

The layout is also beneficial to distribute available electrical horsepower to maximize torque and power in response to road grip conditions and weight transfer in the vehicle. For example, during hard acceleration, the front motor must reduce torque and power in order to prevent the front wheels from spinning as weight transfers to the rear of the vehicle. The excess power is transferred to the rear motor where it can be used immediately. The opposite applies when braking, when the front motor can accept more regenerative braking torque and power.

In addition, electric vehicles may be equipped with more than two electric motors to achieve greater power output and superior handling. The first mass-produced triple-motor layout was introduced on the Audi e-tron in 2020, which consists of one motor at the front and two motors at the rear.

References

Four-wheel drive layout
Electric vehicle technologies